Kacheh Gonbad, also rendered as Gacheh Gonbad, may refer to:
 Kacheh Gonbad, Bijar
 Kacheh Gonbad, Chang Almas, Bijar County